William Blount (1749–1800) was an American statesman and land speculator.

William Blount may also refer to:

People
William Blount (Rutland MP), Member of Parliament (MP) for Rutland in 1301
William Blount, 4th Baron Mountjoy (c. 1478–1534), English scholar
William Blount (MP for Much Wenlock), in 1542, MP for Much Wenlock
William Blount, 7th Baron Mountjoy (1561–1594), English peer
Willie Blount (1768–1835), governor of Tennessee
William Grainger Blount (1784–1827), American congressman
William Blount (MP for Derbyshire), Member of Parliament (MP) for Derbyshire
William B. Blount (born 1954), Alabama investment banker

Other uses
William Blount High School, a public high school in Blount County, Tennessee

See also
William Blunt (disambiguation)
Blount (surname)